Cooper City is a city in Broward County, Florida, United States. The city is named for Morris Cooper, who founded the community in 1959. The city's population was 34,401 at the 2020 census.

In 2006, with the annexation of the Waldrep Dairy Farm, Cooper City started construction on the first major new home construction project within the past few decades. It was expected the addition of the  property would add upwards of 4,000 new residents through 2011.

Geography
The city is bounded by Davie to the north, Pembroke Pines to the south, both Hollywood and Davie to the east, and Southwest Ranches to the west.

Demographics

2020 census

As of the 2020 United States census, there were 34,401 people, 11,280 households, and 9,321 families residing in the city.

2010 census

As of 2010, there were 9,912 households, out of which 2.9% were vacant. In 2000, 51.5% had children under the age of 18 living with them, 70.8% were married couples living together, 11.9% had a female householder with no spouse present, and 14.2% were non-families. 10.8% of all households were made up of individuals, and 3.1% had someone living alone who was 65 years of age or older. The average household size was 3.06 and the average family size was 3.30.

2000 census
In 2000, the city the population was spread out, with 31.3% under the age of 18, 6.3% from 18 to 24, 30.2% from 25 to 44, 25.5% from 45 to 64, and 6.7% who were 65 years of age or older. The median age was 37 years. For every 100 females, there were 94.1 males. For every 100 females age 18 and over, there were 88.8 males.

In 2000, the median income for a household in the city was $75,166, and the median income for a family was $78,172. Males had a median income of $51,931 versus $33,788 for females. The per capita income for the city was $27,474. About 2.9% of families and 3.2% of the population were below the poverty line, including 3.2% of those under age 18 and 4.7% of those age 65 or over.

As of 2000, English was spoken as a first language by 78.55% of the population, while Spanish was spoken by 15.08%, and Hebrew speakers made up 1.25% of all residents. Other mother tongues included languages such as both French and Malayalam making up 0.75% of residents, as well as Italian being at 0.69%, while Chinese was at 0.59%.

As of 2000, Cooper City had the sixty-fifth highest percentage of Cuban residents in the US, at 5.29% of the city's population (tied with West Palm Beach), and it had the ninety-second highest percentage of Colombian residents in the US, which made up 1.78% of all residents (tied with Pinecrest and South Bound Brook, New Jersey).

Education

Public schools
Broward County Public Schools operates public schools.

Elementary schools
 Cooper City Elementary has attained an "A" rating for 2018/2019.
 Embassy Creek Elementary is an elementary school located in Cooper City that teaches grades K–5. The school is a member of the Broward School District. It is an "A" school and is currently ranked number 36 out of about 3000 schools in the state of Florida for 2011. It is named after its nearby developments of Embassy Lakes and Rock Creek.
 Griffin Elementary School is an elementary school located in Cooper City which teaches grades K–5. The school has also attained an "A" rating for 2018/2019.
 Elementary schools in other municipalities serving sections of Cooper City: Hawkes Bluff in Southwest Ranches.

Middle schools
 Pioneer Middle School is a middle school located in Cooper City that teaches grades 6–8. Pioneer Middle School was rated the number 2 middle school in Broward County, and number 55 in the State out of 583 schools in the state of Florida for 2011. The school has maintained an "A" rating since the Florida Department of Education began grading schools in the late 1990s.
 Some of the western part of the city is instead zoned to Silver Trail Middle School in Pembroke Pines.

High school
 Cooper City High School has attained an "A" rating for 2020/2021. It is currently ranked among the top ten percent schools in America. It is the number 46 high school in Florida and one of the top schools in Broward County. It serves students from 9–12. Cooper City High offers more than twenty-two AP classes. The AP participation in Cooper City is 48%, which makes it  one of the highest AP participation schools in Broward county.
 Some areas are jointly zoned to Cooper City High and West Broward High School.

Private schools

 Potential Christian Academy (formerly Flamingo Road Christian Academy) is the school ministry of Potential Church. Established in 1983 as a preschool program, PCA has grown to include Pre-K–8th grade. On October 10, 2010 the school changed its name to Potential Christian Academy from Flamingo Road Christian Academy.
 Franklin Academy is a public charter school serving students in kindergarten through eighth grade.
 Nur-ul Islam Academy is a private Islamic school located in Cooper City, founded in 1996. It serves students from Pre-K–12th grade.
 First Baptist Academy is a ministry of First Baptist Church of Southwest Broward and is located in Cooper City. It was started in 2010 and serves grades K4–12th. First Baptist Academy is accredited through Faccs.

Sports

Brian Piccolo Park in Cooper City is the location of a cricket grounds, and in 2004 played host to first-class cricket when the United States cricket team played Canada in the ICC Intercontinental Cup. It also served as the home ground for the Florida Thunder Pro Cricket team in 2004. The park is also home to one of the few cycling tracks in South Florida. The park also encompasses a skateboard park. There are three other parks in Cooper City, Bill Lips Park, Cooper City Sports Complex, and Flamingo West Park.

Cooper City is also the birthplace of Troy State defensive end Ken Wagner, who was a part of their National Championship team in the late 1980s.

Former Miami Dolphins place kicker Olindo Mare graduated from Cooper City High School in 1991.

 Nick Lucena, Olympian
 Eric Hosmer, current first baseman for the Boston Red Sox and former first baseman for the San Diego Padres and Kansas City Royals.
 Skai Moore, American football linebacker for the Indianapolis Colts
 Rick Shaw, radio disc jockey (WQAM )

Sister city
 Killarney, Ireland

References

External links
 Cooper City official website

Cities in Broward County, Florida
Populated places established in 1959
Cities in Florida